326th may refer to:

326th Aeronautical Systems Wing (326 ASW), a wing of the US Air Force assigned to the Aeronautical Systems Center at Wright-Patterson Air Force Base, Ohio
326th Air Division, an inactive United States Air Force organization
326th Airlift Squadron (326 AS), part of the 512th Airlift Wing at Dover Air Force Base, Delaware
326th Bombardment Squadron, an inactive United States Air Force unit
326th Fighter-Interceptor Squadron, an inactive United States Air Force unit
326th Infantry Division (Wehrmacht), formed on November 9, 1942, to serve as an occupation force in France
326th Medical Battalion (United States), now the 626th Brigade Support Battalion, a unit of the 101st Airborne Division

See also
326 (number)
326, the year 326 (CCCXXVI) of the Julian calendar